Kim Jong-Min (born 3 October 1993) is a South Korean footballer who plays as a midfielder for Busan IPark in the K League Challenge.

Career
Kim signed with Busan IPark on 30 December 2015. He made his debut for the club on 8 May 2016 in a 3–1 victory over FC Anyang.

Club career statistics
As of 5 November 2016

References

1993 births
Living people
Association football midfielders
South Korean footballers
Busan IPark players
K League 2 players
Chungbuk National University alumni